Botad District is a district of the state of Gujarat, India. It was created on 15 August 2013 from the southwestern part of Ahmedabad District and the northwestern part of Bhavnagar District. Botad consist of four talukas: Botad, Gadhada, Barvala, Ranpur.  Botad city is the administrative headquarters of the district.

This district is surrounded by Bhavnagar District to the southeast, Surendranagar District to the north and northwest, Amreli District to the southwest, Ahmedabad District to the northeast and Rajkot District to the west.

History 
The creation of Botad district was announced by the then Chief Minister of Gujarat Narendra Modi as part of Swami Vivekananda Vikas Yatra on September 23, 2012.  Botad district has been formed by splitting two talukas each from Ahmedabad and Bhavnagar districts .  Garhda and Botad talukas of Bhavnagar district and Barwala and Ranpur talukas of Ahmedabad district were included in this new Botad district.

Botad district is administratively divided into 2 provinces and 4 taluks and there are 3 municipalities in the district.

Divisions 
Botad District consists of four talukas:
Botad
Gadhada
Barwala
Ranpur

Demographics 
Botad had a sex ratio of 945 females per 1000 males. Scheduled Castes and Scheduled Tribes are 43,270 (6.60%) and 1,298 (0.20%) of the population respectively.

Hindus were 612,159 while Muslims were 37,066 and Jains 5,835.

Gujarati is the predominant language, spoken by 99.66% of the population.

Politics
  

|}

Places of interest 
 Hanuman Temple, Salangpur
 Shree Swaminarayan Temple, Gadhada

References

External links
 Official website
 Collectorate office

 
Districts of Gujarat
2013 establishments in Gujarat